Talala is a town in Rogers County, Oklahoma, United States. The population was 273 at the 2010 census.

History
The Talala Post Office was established June 23, 1890. Talala was named for Captain John Talala of the 3rd Regiment, Indian Home Guard and a prominent Cherokee. It is mentioned in the Talala History Book that the word ta la la is associated with the tapping of a woodpecker's bill, which the woodpecker is a red-headed woodpecker that had these numerous birds there and even today. Talala is a Cherokee word for the Red-Headed Woodpecker.  An Indian made this discovery and so the town has taken this bird as part of its legacy, erecting signs on the North and South end of the town, and on its stationery at Town Hall and in the Museum.

Historical Society
The Talala Historical Society has been active for several years and recently has added a Facebook page in hopes of contacting citizens that lived in the small town years ago. It has achieved this goal and to date it has grown monthly. Its main mission is to keep the memory of a small town alive. There are a few of the original buildings still standing in the Town that have been there either over a 100 years or soon will be 100 years.

Museum
On the property of the Museum, which was the original site of the Talala Post Office decades earlier, lies a statue made by the Talala artist Sandra VanZandt of two eagles with bricks surrounding it. In May 2012 three plaques honoring World War II veterans were displayed proudly nearby. Inside and within its walls, lies most of the town's history.

Geography
Talala is located at  (36.529050, −95.699292).

Demographics

As of the census of 2010, there were 273 people and 81 families residing in the town. There were 128 housing units at an average density of 426.6 per square mile (164.1/km2). The racial makeup of the town was 71.4% White, 0.0% African American, 20.5% Native American, 0.0% Asian, and 8.1% from two or more races. Hispanic or Latino of any race were 0.7% of the population.

There were 109 households, out of which 33.0% had children under the age of 18 living with them, 51.4% were married couples living together, 14.7% had a female householder with no husband present, and 25.7% were non-families. Of all households 22.9% were made up of individuals, and 7.3% had someone living alone who was 65 years of age or older. The average household size was 2.50 and the average family size was 2.85.

In the town, the population was spread out, with 25.6% under the age of 18, 7.7% from 19 to 24, 29.4% from 25 to 44, 23.9% from 45 to 64, and 13.6% who were 65 years of age or older. The median age was 37.8 years. For every 100 females, there were 103.7 males. For every 100 females age 18 and over, there were 101.0 males.

The median income for a household in the town was $40,833, and the median income for a family was $58,250. Males had a median income of $40,833 versus $28,125 for females. The per capita income for the town was $17,810. About 5.9% of families and 8.2% of the population were below the poverty line, including 10.8% of those under the age of eighteen and none of those 65 or over.

References

Further reading
 Shirk, George H. (1987). Oklahoma Place Names. Norman, Oklahoma: University of Oklahoma Press. .

Towns in Oklahoma
Towns in Rogers County, Oklahoma